is a Japanese badminton player. Hobara was the girls' doubles champion at the 2016 World Junior Championships partnered with Nami Matsuyama.

Achievements

BWF World Junior Championships 
Girls' doubles

BWF International Challenge/Series (3 titles, 2 runners-up) 
Women's doubles

  BWF International Challenge tournament
  BWF International Series tournament
  BWF Future Series tournament

References

External links 
 

1998 births
Living people
Sportspeople from Miyagi Prefecture
Japanese female badminton players
21st-century Japanese women